Isaac Penington (1616–1679) was one of the early members of the Religious Society of Friends (Quakers) in England. He wrote about the Quaker movement and was an influential promoter and defender of it.

Penington was the oldest son of Isaac Penington, a Puritan who had served as the Lord Mayor of London. Penington married a widow named Mary Springett and they had five children. Penington's stepdaughter Gulielma Springett married William Penn. Convinced that the Quaker faith was true, Penington and his wife joined the Friends in 1657 or 1658.

Penington became an influential promoter and defender of the Quaker movement, writing extensively on many topics.  His writings are prized for their insightful and eloquent exploration of spiritual experience, with his Letters being read continuously within Quakerism for their spiritual counsel.  His complete works were first published in 1681 and are still in print today.

Penington also published several books about the movement. He was imprisoned six times for his beliefs, starting in 1661.  Sometimes the charge was refusal to take an oath, as this went against Quaker teachings (see Testimony of Integrity). Such action was prohibited by the Quaker Act of 1662, which sought to control members of the group.  At other times Penington was charged with attending a Quaker meeting, which was forbidden by the Conventicle Act of 1664.

Penington's wife, Mary, was a remarkable woman in her own right.  Her daughter Gulielma, from her first marriage to Sir William Springett (who died young), later married William Penn, founder of Pennsylvania; she was his first wife.

Sources 
The Works of Isaac Penington. In four volumes. Glenside, PA: Quaker Heritage Press, 1995–97.

References

External links

Works of Penington Online

English Quakers
Converts to Quakerism
Quaker writers
English Christian theologians
Quaker theologians
1616 births
1679 deaths
17th-century Christian mystics
Protestant mystics